Tao Dan Park (Vietnamese: Công viên Tao Đàn) is an urban park in District 1, Ho Chi Minh City, Vietnam behind the Independence Palace. It is of the largest parks in the city, covering 10 hectares. Part of the park will be used for the Ho Chi Minh City Metro Line 2's Tao Dan Station. The park formerly hosted a bird park that attracted songbird owners.

References 

Geography of Ho Chi Minh City
Parks in Vietnam